Galabgwe Moyana (born 24 May 1990) is a Botswana international footballer who plays for Township Rollers, as a left winger.

Career
Born in Gaborone, Moyana has played club football for Notwane, Mochudi Centre Chiefs, Polokwane City and Township Rollers.

He made his international debut for Botswana in 2012.

International goals
Scores and results list Botswana's goal tally first.

References

1990 births
Living people
Botswana footballers
Botswana international footballers
Association football wingers
Botswana expatriate footballers
Botswana expatriate sportspeople in South Africa
Expatriate soccer players in South Africa
Notwane F.C. players
Mochudi Centre Chiefs SC players
Polokwane City F.C. players
Township Rollers F.C. players